The 2012–13 season was the 65th season in the existence of FC Steaua București and the club's 65th consecutive season in the top flight of Romanian football. In addition to the domestic league, Steaua București participated in this season's edition of the Cupa României and the UEFA Europa League.

Previous season positions

Players

Squad information

|-
|colspan="12"|Players from YS
|-

|-
|colspan="12"|Players sold or loaned out during the season
|-

Transfers

In

Notes
 On 2009–10 season, Steaua's coach dismiss Filip and sent him to second team, from here was loaned to Unirea Urziceni, Snagov and Concordia Chiajna, in June 2012 he returned to first team after in 2011 second team was dissolved.

Out

Statistics

Goalscorers

Competitions

Overall

Liga I

League table

Results summary

Results by round

Points by opponent

Matches

Cupa României

Results

UEFA Europa League

Qualifying rounds

Third qualifying round

Play-off round

Group stage

Results

Knockout phase

Round of 32

Round of 16

Non competitive matches

UEFA Club rankings
This is the current UEFA Club Rankings, including season 2011–12.

Notes and references

2012-13
Steaua Bucuresti season
2012–13 UEFA Europa League participants seasons
2012-13